An ordinary (from Latin ordinarius) is an officer of a church or civic authority who by reason of office has ordinary power to execute laws.

Such officers are found in hierarchically organised churches of Western Christianity which have an ecclesiastical legal system. For example, diocesan bishops are ordinaries in the Catholic Church and the Church of England.<ref>Oxford Dictionary of the Christian Church (1974) arts. "Ordinary" and "Peculiar"</ref> In Eastern Christianity, a corresponding officer is called a hierarch (from Greek  hierarkhēs "president of sacred rites, high-priest" which comes in turn from τὰ ἱερά ta hiera, "the sacred rites" and ἄρχω arkhō, "I rule").

 Ordinary power 
In canon law, the power to govern the church is divided into the power to make laws (legislative), enforce the laws (executive), and to judge based on the law (judicial).  An official exercises power to govern either because he holds an office to which the law grants governing power or because someone with governing power has delegated it to him. Ordinary power is the former, while the latter is delegated power. The office with ordinary power could possess the governing power itself (proper ordinary power) or instead it could have the ordinary power of agency, the inherent power to exercise someone else's power (vicarious ordinary power).

The law vesting ordinary power could either be ecclesiastical law, i.e. the positive enactments that the church has established for itself, or divine law, i.e. the laws which were given to the Church by God. As an example of divinely instituted ordinaries, when Jesus established the Church, he also established the episcopate and the primacy of Peter, endowing the offices with power to govern the Church. Thus, in the Catholic Church, the office of successor of Simon Peter and the office of diocesan bishop possess their ordinary power even in the absence of positive enactments from the Church.

Many officers possess ordinary power but, due to their lack of ordinary executive power, are not called ordinaries. The best example of this phenomenon is the office of judicial vicar, a.k.a. officialis. The judicial vicar only has authority through his office to exercise the diocesan bishop's power to judge cases. Though the vicar has vicarious ordinary judicial power, he is not an ordinary because he lacks ordinary executive power. A vicar general, however, has authority through his office to exercise the diocesan bishop's executive power. He is therefore an ordinary because of this vicarious ordinary executive power.

Catholic usage

Local ordinaries and hierarchs
Local ordinaries exercise ordinary power and are ordinaries in particular churches. The following clerics are local ordinaries:
The Bishop of Rome (the pope) is ordinary for the whole Catholic Church.Code of Canons of the Eastern Churches, canons 43 and 45
In Eastern Catholic churches, patriarchs, major archbishops, and metropolitans have ordinary power of governance for the whole territory of their respective autonomous particular churches.
Diocesan/eparchial bishops/eparchs
Other prelates who head, even if only temporarily, a particular church or a community equivalent to it. Canon 368 of the Code of Canon Law lists five Latin-rite jurisdictional areas that are considered equivalent to a diocese. These are headed by:
A territorial prelature, formerly called a prelate nullius dioceseos (of no diocese), in charge of a geographical area that has not yet been raised to the level of diocese
A territorial abbey, in charge of an area, which in mission countries can be quite vast, associated with an abbey
An apostolic vicar (normally a bishop of a titular see), in charge of an apostolic vicariate, usually in a mission country, not yet ready to be made a diocese
An apostolic prefect (usually not a bishop), in charge of an apostolic prefecture, not yet ready to be made an apostolic vicariate
A permanent apostolic administrator, in charge of a geographical area that for serious reasons cannot be made a diocese.
To these may be added:
An apostolic exarch (normally a bishop of a titular see), in charge of an apostolic exarchate—not yet ready to be made an eparchy—for the faithful of an Eastern Catholic Church in an area that is situated outside the home territory of that Eastern Church
A military ordinariate
A personal prelate, in charge of a group of persons without regard to geography: the only personal prelature existing is that of Opus Dei
An apostolic administrator of a personal apostolic administration: only one exists, the Personal Apostolic Administration of Saint John Mary Vianney
An ordinary of a personal ordinariate for former Anglicans
A superior of an autonomous mission
Of somewhat similar standing is the diocesan administrator (formerly called a vicar capitular) elected to govern a diocese during a vacancy. Apart from certain limitations of nature and law, he has, on a caretaker basis, the same obligations and powers as a diocesan bishop. Occasionally an apostolic administrator is appointed by the Holy See to run a vacant diocese, or even a diocese whose bishop is incapacitated or otherwise impeded.

Also classified as local ordinaries, although they do not head a particular church or equivalent community are:
Vicars general and protosyncelli
Episcopal vicars and syncelli

Ordinaries who are not local ordinaries
Major superiors of religious institutes (including abbots) and of societies of apostolic life are ordinaries of their respective memberships, but not local ordinaries.

Orthodox Christianity

In the Orthodox Church, a hierarch (ruling bishop) holds uncontested authority within the boundaries of his own diocese; no other bishop may perform any sacerdotal functions without the ruling bishop's express invitation. The violation of this rule is called eispēdēsis (Greek: εἰσπήδησις, "trespassing", literally "jumping in"), and is uncanonical. Ultimately, all bishops in the Church are equal, regardless of any title they may enjoy (Patriarch, Metropolitan, Archbishop, etc.). The role of the bishop in the Orthodox Church is both hierarchical and sacramental.

This pattern of governance dates back to the earliest centuries of Christianity, as witnessed by the writings of Ignatius of Antioch (c. 100 AD): The bishop in each Church presides in the place of God.... Let no one do any of the things which concern the Church without the bishop.... Wherever the bishop appears, there let the people be, just as wherever Jesus Christ is, there is the Catholic Church. And it is the bishop's primary and distinctive task to celebrate the Eucharist, "the medicine of immortality."Ignatius of Antioch, Epistle to the Magnesians, VI:1; Epistle to the Smyrneans, VIII:1 and 2; Epistle to the Ephesians, XX:2.

Saint Cyprian of Carthage (258 AD) wrote:The episcopate is a single whole, in which each bishop enjoys full possession. So is the Church a single whole, though it spreads far and wide into a multitude of churches and its fertility increases. Bishop Kallistos (Ware) wrote: There are many churches, but only One Church; many episcopi but only one episcopate."

In Orthodox Christianity, the church is not seen as a monolithic, centralized institution, but rather as existing in its fullness in each local body. The church is defined Eucharistically: in each particular community gathered around its bishop; and at every local celebration of the Eucharist it is the whole Christ who is present, not just a part of Him. Therefore, each local community, as it celebrates the Eucharist ... is the church in its fullness." This is not to say that the Orthodox Church has a Congregationalist polity; on the contrary, the local priest functions as the "hands" of the bishop, and must receive from the bishop an antimension and chrism before he is permitted to celebrate any of the Sacred Mysteries (sacraments) within the diocese.

An Orthodox bishop's authority comes from his election and consecration. He is, however, subject to the Sacred Canons of the Orthodox Church, and answers to the Synod of Bishops to which he belongs. In case an Orthodox bishop is overruled by his local synod, he retains the right of appeal (Greek: Ἔκκλητον, Ékklēton'') to his ecclesiastical superior (e.g. a Patriarch) and his synod.

See also
Military ordinariate

References

Ecclesiastical titles
Canon law
Episcopacy in the Catholic Church
Catholic ecclesiastical titles